The 1966 Eisenhower Trophy took place October 27 to 30 at the Club de Golf Mexico in Mexico City, Mexico. It was the fifth World Amateur Team Championship for the Eisenhower Trophy. The tournament was a 72-hole stroke play team event with 32 four-man teams. The best three scores for each round counted towards the team total.

Australia won the Eisenhower Trophy for the second time, finishing two strokes ahead of the silver medalists, United States. Great Britain and Ireland finished four strokes behind the United States and took the bronze medal while South Africa finished fourth. Ronnie Shade, representing Great Britain and Ireland, was the leading individual with a score of 283, 5 under par, seven strokes better than Patrick Cros from France.

Teams
32 four-man teams contested the event.

Scores

Source:

Individual leaders
There was no official recognition for the lowest individual scores.

Sources:

References

External links
World Amateur Team Championships on International Golf Federation website

Eisenhower Trophy
Golf tournaments in Mexico
Eisenhower Trophy
Eisenhower Trophy
Eisenhower Trophy